Epibrontis is a genus of moths in the family Gelechiidae.

Species
 Epibrontis hemichlaena (Lower, 1897)
 Epibrontis pallacopa Meyrick, 1922

References

Gelechiinae